European route E 38 (E 38) is a west–east European route, running from Hlukhiv in Ukraine to Shymkent in Kazakhstan. In Ukraine, the highway runs from the intersection with European route E 101, through Hlukhiv to the Russian border near Katerynivka.

Main route 
Route follows .

See also

References

External links

038
Ukr